Padmatheertham is a 1978 Indian Malayalam-language film, directed by K. G. Rajasekharan. The film stars Jayabharathi, Jose, Jose Prakash and Unnimary. The film has musical score by K. V. Mahadevan.

Cast
Jayabharathi as Malini
Jose as Venu
Jose Prakash as Achutha Kurup
Unnimary  as Lathika
M. G. Soman as Karunan
Sathaar as Muralidharan
Prema as Madhaviyamma
KPAC Lalitha as Meenakshi
Alummoodan as Krishna Pilla
Nellikode Bhaskaran as Alikutty
Thrissur Elsy as Saramma/Malini's friend
Philomina as Amina
Usharani as Jameela
Kunchan as Rameshan
Bhagyalakshmi as Bharathikutty
Poojappura Ravi as Prabhakaran
Radhadevi as Lathika's mother
Sremoolam Vijayan as Sankara Pilla
Sam as Janardhanan

Soundtrack
The music was composed by K. V. Mahadevan with lyrics by Mankombu Gopalakrishnan.

References

External links
 

1978 films
1970s Malayalam-language films
Films scored by K. V. Mahadevan
Films directed by K. G. Rajasekharan